The 2015 Westmeath Senior Hurling Championship was the 111th staging of the Westmeath Senior Hurling Championship since its establishment by the Westmeath County Board in 1903. The championship began on 18 April 2015 and ended on 18 October 2015.

Raharney were the defending champions. St. Brigid's entered as a promoted team from the intermediate championship.

On 18 October 2015, Clonkill won the championship following a 1-14 to 1-10 defeat of Raharney in the final. This was their 14th championship title, their first in three championship seasons.

St. Oliver Plunkett's were relegated following a 2-11 to 2-10 defeat by Delvin.

Results

Relegation play-off

Semi-finals

Final

References

Waterford Senior Hurling Championship
Westmeath Senior Hurling Championship